Naďa Mertová is an orienteering competitor who competed for Czechoslovakia. At the 1972 World Orienteering Championships in Jičín she placed 10th in the individual competition, and won a bronze medal in the relay with the Czechoslovak team together with Renata Vlachová and Anna Hanzlová.

References

Year of birth missing (living people)
Living people
Czechoslovak orienteers
Female orienteers
Foot orienteers
World Orienteering Championships medalists